Thug Behram (c. 1765 – 1840), also known as Buhram Jamedar and the King of the Thugs, was a leader of the Thuggee cult active in Oudh in central India during the late 18th and early 19th century, and is often cited as one of the world's most prolific serial killers. He may have been involved in up to 931 murders by strangulation between 1790 and 1840 performed with a ceremonial rumāl, a handkerchief-like cloth used by his cult as a garrote. Only 125 were confirmed.

Biography
While Behram is sometimes suspected of having committed 931 murders, James Paton, an East India Company officer working for the Thuggee and Dacoity Office in the 1830s who wrote a manuscript on Thuggee, quotes Behram as saying he had "been present" at 931 cases of murder, and "I may have strangled with my own hands about 125 men, and I may have seen strangled 150 more."

The English word 'thug' is in fact borrowed from the Hindi word 'thag' (ठग). The thugs were covert members of a group, and the term 'Thugee' typically referred to an act of deceitful and organised robbery and murder.

Buhram used his cummerbund or rumāl, with a large medallion sewn into it, as a garrote to execute his killing. Through sheer skill, he could cast the rumal to cause the medallion to land at the adam's apple of his victims, adding pressure to the throat when he strangled them.

See also
List of serial killers before 1900
The Deadly Dozen: India's Most Notorious Serial Killers

References

1765 births
1840 deaths
Executed Indian people
Executed Indian serial killers
Indian gangsters
Indian people convicted of murder
Male serial killers
People executed by British India by hanging
Year of birth uncertain
People from Jabalpur
Criminals from Uttar Pradesh